Veysi may refer to:
 Veysi, Behbahan
 Veysi, Gotvand